Head Office is a 1936 British drama film directed by Melville W. Brown and starring Owen Nares, Nancy O'Neil and Arthur Margetson. Its plot involves a secretary who is wrongly accused of stealing money from the company she works for. It was made at Teddington Studios by the British subsidiary of Warner Brothers.

Cast

References

Bibliography
 Low, Rachael. Filmmaking in 1930s Britain. George Allen & Unwin, 1985.
 Wood, Linda. British Films, 1927-1939. British Film Institute, 1986.

External links

1936 films
British drama films
1936 drama films
Films shot at Teddington Studios
Warner Bros. films
Films based on British novels
Films directed by Melville W. Brown
British black-and-white films
1930s English-language films
1930s British films